Abū ʿAbd Allāh Muḥammad ibn Yazīd Ibn Mājah al-Rabʿī al-Qazwīnī ((b. 209/824, d. 273/887) commonly known as Ibn Mājah, was a medieval scholar of hadith of Persian origin.  He compiled the last of Sunni Islam's six canonical hadith collections, Sunan Ibn Mājah.

Biography

Ibn Mājah was born in Qazwin, the modern-day Iranian province of Qazvin, in 824 CE/209 AH to a family who were members (mawla) of the Rabīʻah tribe. Mājah was the nickname of his father, and not that of his grandfather nor was it his mother's name, contrary to those claiming this. The hāʼ at the end is un-voweled whether in stopping upon its pronunciation or continuing because it a non-Arabic name.

He left his hometown to travel the Islamic world visiting Iraq, Makkah, the Levant and Egypt. He studied under Ibn Abi Shaybah (through whom came over a quarter of al-Sunan), Muḥammad ibn ʻAbdillāh ibn Numayr, Jubārah ibn al-Mughallis, Ibrāhīm ibn al-Mundhir al-Ḥizāmī, ʻAbdullāh ibn Muʻāwiyah, Hishām ibn ʻAmmār, Muḥammad ibn Rumḥ, Dāwūd ibn Rashīd and others from their era. Abū Yaʻlā al-Khalīlī praised Ibn Mājah as "reliable (thiqah), prominent, agreed upon, a religious authority, possessing knowledge and the capability to memorize."

According to al-Dhahabī, Ibn Mājah died on approximately February 19, 887 CE/with eight days remaining of the month of Ramadan, 273 AH, or, according to al-Kattānī, in either 887/273 or 889/275. He died in Qazwin.

What he compiled/did
Al-Dhahabī mentioned the following of Ibn Mājah's works:
 Sunan Ibn Mājah: one of the six canonical collections of hadith
 Kitāb al-Tafsīr: a book of Qur'an exegesis
 Kitāb al-Tārīkh: a book of history or, more likely, a listing of hadith transmitters

The Sunan

The Sunan consists of 1,500 chapters and about 4,000 hadith. Upon completing it, he read it to Abu Zur’a al-Razi, a hadith authority of his time, who commented, "I think that were people to get their hands on this, the other collections, or most of them, would be rendered obsolete."

References

Further reading
 Suhaib Hasan Abdul Ghaffar, Criticism of Hadith among Muslims with reference to Sunan Ibn Maja, Presidency of Islamic Research, IFTA and Propagation: Riyadh 1984. .
 Brown, Jonathan A. C.  ‘The canonization of Ibn Mâjah: authenticity vs. utility in the formation of the Sunni ḥadîth canon’. Pages 169–81 in  Écriture de l’histoire et processus de canonisation dans les premiers siècles de l’islam. Directed by Antoine Borrut. Revue des mondes musulmans et de la Méditerranée 129. Aix-en-Provence: Presses Universitaires de Provence, 2011.
 Robson, James.  'The Transmission of Ibn Majah's "Sunan"', Journal of Semitic studies 3 (1958): 129–41.

External links

 Biodata at MuslimScholars.info
 Biography at Sunnah.com
 Sunan Ibn Majah – Searchable Sunan Ibn Majah Online
 Biography of Imam Ibn Maajah at theclearpath.com
Abu `Abdallah Muhammad ibn Yazid Ibn Maja al-Rab`i al-Qazwini: Sunan Ibn -e- Majah – 3 Volumes – Translation By Shaykh Muhammad Qasim Ameen
 Biography of Imam Ibn Mâjah by at-tawhid.net 

824 births
887 deaths
Hadith compilers
People from Qazvin
Hadith scholars
Atharis
9th-century Iranian people
9th-century writers
9th-century jurists